A total solar eclipse occurred on May 9, 1910. A solar eclipse occurs when the Moon passes between Earth and the Sun, thereby totally or partly obscuring the image of the Sun for a viewer on Earth. A total solar eclipse occurs when the Moon's apparent diameter is larger than the Sun's, blocking all direct sunlight, turning day into darkness. Totality occurs in a narrow path across Earth's surface, with the partial solar eclipse visible over a surrounding region thousands of kilometres wide. Totality was visible from part of Wilkes Land in Antarctica and Tasmania in Australia.

Related eclipses

Solar eclipses of 1910–1913

Metonic series

References

1910 05 09
1910 in science
1910 05 09
May 1910 events